Katsia II Dadiani (died 1788), of the House of Dadiani, was Prince of Mingrelia from 1758 to 1788. His rule was dominated by complicated relations with the Kingdom of Imereti, which claimed suzerainty over all of western Georgia. In efforts to further his precarious sovereignty, Dadiani easily switched sides, allying himself, alternatively, with the Imeretians, Russians, and Ottomans, as exemplified by his vacillating position during the Russo-Turkish War (1768–1774).

Early rule 
Katsia was a son of Otia Dadiani on whose death he succeeded as prince-regnant of Mingrelia in 1758. In 1757, he had commanded a Mingrelian detachment which fought in the ranks of a united army of the western Georgian rulers led by King Solomon I of Imereti in the victorious battle of Khresili with the invading Ottoman forces. In 1759, he was among signatories of a convention of the leading ecclesiastical and lay dignitaries of western Georgia, swearing to resist Ottoman demands for resumption of slave trade banned by Solomon I.

Conflict with Imereti  
Katsia's relations with Solomon subsequently deteriorated over Dadiani's submission to the Ottoman authority in 1765 and his support to Solomon's rivals, Imereti's anti-king Teimuraz in 1766 and Solomon's defiant vassal Rostom, Duke of Racha, in 1768. Katsia feared his principality could share the fate of Racha, which fell to Solomon in 1769, and attempted to further his sovereignty by creating a separate church for Mingrelia, independent of that of Imereti, with Besarion, brother of Rostom of Racha, as its head.

Turkish war 
During the Russian–Ottoman war of 1768–1774, Katsia initially joined the Ottomans, while Solomon made an alliance with the Russians. In December 1769, Solomon defeated Katsia and his Abkhazian ally, a Shervashidze, and raided Mingrelia. Katsia then decided to make use of the presence of Russian troops in Imereti and Solomon's complicated relations with their commander, Count Totleben, and took an oath of fealty to the Russian monarch Catherine the Great. Totleben's successor, General Sukhotin, attempted to mediate the conflict, but Solomon demanded his suzerainty over Mingrelia be recognized and the dispute over the district of Lechkhumi be settled in Imereti's favor. After Sukhotin's failure to take the Ottoman-garrisoned Mingrelian port of Poti, for which he blamed Dadiani, Katsia broke with the Russians, but he had to withdraw from a renewed onslaught on Imereti, led by the Ottoman pasha of Akhaltsikhe, under pressure of Heralcius II, king of Kartli–Kakheti in eastern Georgia.

Later rule 
In 1776, Solomon, by force of arms, compelled Katsia to recognize his suzerainty and accept the ecclesiastical authority of Imereti. Mingrelia benefited from this peace agreement, for the Imeretian support proved crucial in routing a major Abkhaz-Circassian attack at Rukhi in 1780. Katsia then intervened in Abkhazia, helping Zurab Shervashidze briefly oust Kelesh Bey from Sukhumi.   

In 1784, Dadiani defected Solomon during the king's ultimately disastrous expedition into the Ottoman territory north of Batumi. In power struggles that followed Solomon's death later that year, Katsia rendered important services to a new king of Imereti, David II, his cousin, for which he was rewarded with the fiefs of Sachilao and Samikelao.  

Katsia II Dadiani died in 1788 and was buried at the Martvili Monastery. He was succeeded by his 18-year-old son, Grigol.

Family 
Katsia II Dadiani was married three times. His first wife was Darejan Shervashidze, an Abkhazian princess, whom he divorced. In 1765, Katsia married his second wife, Elisabed (March 25, 1750 – May 8, 1770), daughter of Teimuraz II of Kakheti. His third and last consort was Anna, daughter of the Imeretian prince Paata Tsulukidze, by whom Katsia had several children:

 Grigol Dadiani (1770–1804), Prince of Mingrelia (1788–1804, with intermissions); 
 Prince Otia Dadiani;
 Prince Bezhan Dadiani;
 Manuchar II Dadiani (died c. 1840), Prince of Mingrelia (1791–1793);
 Tariel Dadiani, Prince of Mingrelia (1793–1794, 1802);
 Prince Giorgi Dadiani;
 Prince Levan Dadiani;
 Mariam Dadiani (1783–1841), wife of King Solomon II of Imereti;
 Princess Tamar, wife of Sefer Ali-Bey Shervashidze, Prince of Abkhazia;
 Princess Elisabed, wife of Prince Rostom Tsereteli.

Notes

References 
 

  

 

 

1788 deaths
House of Dadiani
18th-century people from Georgia (country)
People of the Russo-Turkish War (1768–1774)